Professor Oron Shagrir (born 1961) is an Israeli philosopher and cognitive scientist.

Oron Shagrir is Schulman Chair of Philosophy and professor of Philosophy and of Cognitive and Brain Sciences at the Hebrew University of Jerusalem in Jerusalem, Israel.

Shagrir received a BSc degree in Mathematics and Computer Science and then an MA degree in Philosophy of
Science (supervised by Itamar Pitowsky) from the Hebrew University of Jerusalem. He then received a PhD degree in Philosophy and Cognitive Science from the University of California, San Diego in the United States in 1995, having been supervised by Patricia Churchland.

Oron Shagrir has been the Vice Rector (2013–2017) and then Vice President (2017 onwards) for international affairs at the Hebrew University of Jerusalem. Shagrir was also the head of the Cognitive Science department in the university.

Shagrir's areas of research interest include the conceptual foundations of (mainly computational) cognitive and brain sciences, the history and philosophy of computing and computability, and "supervenience". His publications include:

 Computability: Turing, Gödel, Church, and Beyond (with Jack Copeland and Carl Posy), MIT Press, 2013. .
 A special journal issue on the history of modern computing (with Jack Copeland, Carl Posy, and Parker Bright, The Rutherford Journal), 2010.

Shagrir is on the editorial boards of The Rutherford Journal and the Springer book series Studies in Brain and Mind. In 2017, Shagrir contributed to The Turing Guide.

References

External links
 Oron Shagrir home page
 
 Oron Shagrir on Academia.edu
 Oron Shagrir on ResearchGate

1961 births
Living people
Hebrew University of Jerusalem alumni
University of California, San Diego alumni
Israeli historians
21st-century Israeli philosophers
Jewish philosophers
Israeli cognitive scientists
Historians of mathematics
Academic staff of the Hebrew University of Jerusalem